Hari Novian Caniago (born on November 6, 1986) is an Indonesian footballer who currently plays for Persita Tangerang in the Indonesia Super League.

Club career statistics

References

External links

1986 births
Association football defenders
Living people
Indonesian footballers
Liga 1 (Indonesia) players
Persiwa Wamena players
Indonesian Premier Division players
Persik Kediri players
PS Pasbar West Pasaman players
PSCS Cilacap players
PSP Padang players